Wentworth South was a federal electoral district represented in the House of Commons of Canada from 1867 to 1904. it was located near Hamilton in the province of Ontario.

It was created by the British North America Act of 1867.  The "South Riding of Wentworth" initially consisted of the Townships of Saltfleet, Binbrook, Glanford, Barton and Ancaster. In 1882, the townships of Grimsby and Caistor, and the village of Grimsby were added, while the Township of Ancaster was removed.

In 1892, it was called "South Wentworth" and redefined to consist of the townships of Saltfleet, Binbrooke, Barton, Glanford, North and South Grimsby, Caistor, East and West Flamborough, the town of Dundas, and the villages of Grimsby and Waterdown.

The electoral district was abolished in 1903 when it was redistributed between Lincoln and Wentworth ridings.

Electoral history

|-
  
|Liberal
| Joseph Rymal  
|align="right"|1,015 
 
|Unknown
|Thomas Robertson
|align="right"| 988
|}

|-
  
|Liberal
|RYMAL, Joseph  
|align="right"|1,203 
 
|Unknown
|BETHUNE, A.  
|align="right"| 995   
|}

|-
  
|Liberal
|RYMAL, Joseph  
|align="right"| 1,184 
  
|Conservative
| BULL, H.B.  
|align="right"| 875    
|}

|-
  
|Liberal
|RYMAL, Joseph  
|align="right"| 1,169
 
|Unknown
| CARPENTER, F.M.
|align="right"| 1,095   
|}

|-
  
|Liberal
|SPRINGER, Lewis 
|align="right"| 1,253 
 
|Unknown
|WADDELL, R.R.
|align="right"| 1,205  
|}

|-
  
|Conservative
|CARPENTER, F.M.  
|align="right"| 1,839    
  
|Liberal
|RUSSELL, Jas.  
|align="right"|1,663   
|}

|-
  
|Conservative
|CARPENTER, F.M.  
|align="right"| 1,773    
  
|Liberal
|MIDDLETON, Jas. T. 
|align="right"|1,772  
|}

|-
  
|Liberal
|BAIN, Thomas
|align="right"| 2,673 
  
|Conservative
|PETTIT, Andrew H.
|align="right"| 2,486
|}

|-
  
|Conservative
|SMITH, Ernest D'Israeli
|align="right"|2,584   
  
|Liberal
|SEALEY, William Oscar 
|align="right"| 2,428
|}

See also 

 List of Canadian federal electoral districts
 Past Canadian electoral districts

External links 

 Website of the Parliament of Canada

Former federal electoral districts of Ontario